La Cruz de Río Grande is a municipality in the South Caribbean Coast Autonomous Region of Nicaragua. According to the 2005 census, the population of La Cruz de Rio Grande was 3,000. It gets its name from the Rio Grande de Matagalpa which flows through it.

The town was founded in 1922 by Chinese traders to serve workers from a banana plantation further upriver.

See also
Chinese Nicaraguan

References

External links
LaPrensa.com.ni  La Cruz de Río Grande produce cacao 

Municipalities of the South Caribbean Coast Autonomous Region